Jeremy Tilse (born 2 June 1986 in Newcastle, Australia) is a rugby union footballer. He plays for the Waratahs in Super Rugby. His regular playing position is prop.

He made his senior debut during the 2007 Super 14 season against the Cheetahs. His cousin is former Canberra Raiders and current Hull Kingston Rovers player Dane Tilse.

References 
 http://www.adelaidenow.com.au/sport/rugby-gold/sydney-unis-jeremy-tilse-in-line-for-waratahs-call-up/story-fnbzofld-1226327220719

External links 
 Waratahs player profile
 itsrugby.co.uk profile

1986 births
Australian rugby union players
New South Wales Waratahs players
Rugby union props
Living people
Sydney Stars players
Rugby union players from Newcastle, New South Wales